This is a list of all the episodes of Gogs. The claymation animated television series began as a little-known show on the Welsh television channel S4C on 21 December 1993, complete with Welsh language subtitles and credits. The show was translated for English language audiences and received international attention and acclaim when it was shown on BBC2 at Christmas time on 21 December 1996. The following listings are for these latter, more well-known showings.

In 1997, a second series of a further eight episodes were aired specifically for an English-speaking audience, and were aired in the UK, US and Australia.

Gogs ended in 1998 after running for these two series, and a total of 13 episodes. Episodes were generally around five to six minutes long.

There was also a 30-minute-long special, Gogwana.

Selected episodes were made available on VHS. All 13 episodes are now available on a single DVD released 9 April 2001 and in the 2018 DVD and Blu-Ray vision for 12 January 2018.

Summary

Series 1 (1993)

Series 2 (1997)

Credits (from Series 1993 to 1996)
 Based on an Original Idea by: Deiniol Morris, Michael Mort, Siôn Jones
Voices: Marie Clifford, Gillian Elisa, Dafydd Emyr, Rob Rackstraw, Nick Upton
Music: Arwyn Davies
Models: Michael Mort, Lorraine Ford
Sets: Siôned Jones, Ian Harvey
Titles: Steven Rowlandson
Animation Accountant for HTV: Emlyn Penny-Jones
Production Co-ordinator: Ann Gwynne
Sound Design: ReelWorks
Sound Mixing: Wild Tracks, Sounds in Motion
Assistant Animators: Jody Meredith, Nigel Leach
Executive Producers: Meirion Davies for S4C and Colin Rose for BBC
Animated and Directed by: Deniol Morris, Michael Mort
 An Aaargh! Animation Ltd Production for S4C in Association with BBC Bristol 
Copyright S4C and HTV MCMXCIII to MCMXCVI.

Gogwana (1998)

Credits/Production Staff 
Voices: Marie Clifford, Gillian Elisa, Dafydd Emyr, Josie Lawrence, Rob Rackstraw, Nick Upton
Animation: Suzy Fagan, Jody Meredith, Mike Mort, Chris Sadler, Ian Whitlock, Terry Brain, Will Hodge, Jon Pinfield
Animation Assistant: Alison Evans
Production Manager: Jon Wigfield
Production Coordinator: Ann Gwynne
Production Accountant: Keith Evans
Director of Photography: Paul Smith
Camera Operators: Charles Copping, Toby Howell; Beth McDonald, Jon Gregory, Stephen Andrews
Gaffer: Clive Scott
Electricians: Carl Hulme, Jon Graves
Supervising Modelmakers: Lorraine Mason, Nigel Leach
Modelmakers: Marcus Noonan, Salinee Mukhood
Sets: Farrington Lewis & Company Ltd
Monitor Lizard: 'Fat Wally'
Film Editor: Tamsin Parri
Sound Design: Reel Works
Dubbing Mixer: Graham Pickford
Titles and Special Effects Video Post Production: Ocean Digital Pictures
Telecine: Spirit Pictures
Music Composed by: Arwyn Davies
Music Arranged and Conducted by: Nic Raine
Writers: Sion Jones, Deiniol Morris, Mike Mort, Joe Turner
Executive Producers: Mike Mort, Deiniol Morris
Executive Producer for S4C: Meirion Davies
Executive Producer for the BBC: Colin Rose
Produced by: Helen Nabarro
Directed by: Deiniol Morris
An Aaargh! and S4C production for BBC Bristol
Copyright S4C and Aaargh! Animation Ltd and BBC Bristol MCMXCVIII. All rights reserved.

External links
 Gogs series entry in the Internet Movie Database
 Gogwana special IMDB entry
 Toonhound - Gogs!
 Toonhound - Gogwana

Gogs